Stefano Galvani and Alberto Martín were the defenders of title, but they chose to not participate this year.
James Auckland and Travis Rettenmaier won in the final 7–5, 6–7(6), [10–4], against Dušan Karol and Jaroslav Pospíšil.

Seeds

Draw

Draw

References
 Main Draw

Mitsubishi Electric Europe Cup - Doubles
Internazionali di Monza E Brianza